Among the numerous literary works titled Selected Poems are the following:

Selected Poems (Conrad Aiken) by Conrad Aiken 
Selected Poems (Robert Frost) by Robert Frost
Selected Poems (Galway Kinnell) by Galway Kinnell
Selected Poems (MacDiarmid) by Hugh MacDiarmid
Selected Poems (Howard Moss) by Howard Moss
Selected Poems (Robert Nathan) by Robert Nathan
Selected Poems (Sylvia Plath) by Sylvia Plath
Selected Poems (Robert Pinsky) by Robert Pinsky
Selected Poems (J. C. Ransom) by John Crowe Ransom
Selected Poems (C. A. Smith) by Clark Ashton Smith
Selected Poems (James Tate) by James Tate
Selected Poems (Vern Rutsala) by Vern Rutsala

See also
Collected Poems (disambiguation)